Bacca is a surname. Notable people with the surname include:

Ademir Antonio Bacca, Brazilian writer
Carlos Bacca (b. 1986), Colombian football player
Estefanía Bacca, Argentine vedette
Juan David García Bacca (1901 - 1992), Spanish-Venezuelan philosopher
Pippa Bacca (1974 – 2008), Italian feminist artist
Sonia Bacca, Italian physicist

See also

Baca (surname)
Bača (surname)